The Internazionali di Tennis Country 2001 Team was a professional tennis tournament played on clay courts. It was part of the ATP Challenger Tour. It was held in Padua, Italy in 2018.

Past finals

Singles

Doubles

ATP Challenger Tour
Clay court tennis tournaments
Tennis tournaments in Italy
Padua